Ballarat Dragons Rugby League Football Club is an Australian rugby league football club based in Ballarat, Victoria. They conduct teams for both junior, senior and women tag teams. Previously known as Ballarat Highlanders competing in the Melbourne Rugby League. The club rebranded in 2005 to be known as the Dragons after the Central Highlands Rugby League was established.

See also

Rugby league in Victoria

References

External links
Ballarat Dragons RLFC Fox Sports pulse

Rugby league teams in Victoria (Australia)
Rugby clubs established in 2005
2005 establishments in Australia
Ballarat